Nicolae Frunză (born 15 November 1997 in Bucharest) is a Romanian professional tennis player.

Frunză has a career high ATP singles ranking of 442 achieved on 26 June 2017. He also has a career high ATP doubles ranking of 442 achieved on 24 October 2016.

Frunză represents Romania at the Davis Cup making his debut on 16 September 2017 playing doubles with Horia Tecău against Austria's doubles pair consisting of Philipp Oswald and Dominic Thiem in 1st round play-offs of Group I.

ATP Challenger Tour and ITF Futures/World Tennis Tour finals

Singles: 11 (8-3)

Doubles: 14 (5 titles, 9 runners-up)

Davis Cup

Singles performances (0–1)

Doubles performances (1–0)

References

External links
 
 
 

1997 births
Living people
Romanian male tennis players
Tennis players from Bucharest
21st-century Romanian people